WSJ, or The Wall Street Journal, is a US newspaper specializing in financial news.

WSJ may also refer to:

 The Wall Street Journal Asia, the Asian edition
 The Wall Street Journal Europe, the Europe edition
 WSJ., a magazine by the US newspaper debuting on September 6, 2008
 Weekly Shōnen Jump, a Japanese manga magazine 
 Winston-Salem Journal, a US newspaper in Winston-Salem, North Carolina
 Wisconsin State Journal, a US newspaper in Madison, Wisconsin
 World Scout Jamboree, a quadrennial international Scouting event
 The World Series of Jetsprinting, a boating event